Herbert Scurla (21 April 1905, Großräschen – 7 April 1981, Kolkwitz) was a German writer and academic.

Biography 

Herbert Scurla was born in 1905 in Großräschen, Brandenburg. He studied law and economics in Berlin. He joined the Nazi Party in May 1933, as well as other Nazi organisations. Throughout the 1930s, Scurla worked for the German Office of University Exchanges, which in 1934 became the Ministry of Education of the Reich. In the 1930s and 1940s, he taught, including in public policy, and lived in Turkey in 1937 and 1939 to extend the reach of German universities. He escaped the incorporation into the Wehrmacht. In 1945, he became an apprentice joiner. In 1948, he lived in the Soviet zone, and became a member of the National Democratic Party (Nationaldemokratische Partei Deutschlands, NDPD) which "recycled" former Nazis. From  1952, he lived in Cottbus, and became a writer. He published biographies and travel books with great success. He was very active in the East German cultural milieu. He died in 1981 in Cottbus. A specialist in dissimulation, Scurla often used pseudonyms, and while well known as a former Nazi, he lived in the Soviet occupied zone (1945–1949) of the East Germany (1949–1990) without problems.

Distinctions
Herbert Scurla was decorated in 1974 with the Vaterländischer Verdienstorden.

Bibliography 

 Dirk Halm and Faruk Sen (Ed.), Exil sous le croissant et l'étoile. Rapport d'Herbert Scurla sur l'activité des universitaires allemands pendant le IIIe Reich, éditions Turquoise, Paris, 2009

1905 births
1981 deaths
People from Großräschen
People from the Province of Brandenburg
Nazi Party members
National Democratic Party of Germany (East Germany) politicians
Cultural Association of the GDR members
East German writers
Writers from Brandenburg
German male writers
Recipients of the Patriotic Order of Merit